Anette Tønsberg (born 2 April 1970) is a Norwegian speed skater.

Biography
Tønsberg was born in Lørenskog and represented the club Aurskog/Finstadbru SK. She competed at the 1992 Winter Olympics in Albertville and at the 1998 Winter Olympics in Nagano.

She was Norwegian all-round champion 1994-1998 and in 2002. Her personal best times were 40.24 in the 500 metres (1999); 1:18.50 in the 1000 metres (1999); 2:00.10 in the 1500 metres (1998); 4:12.92 in the 3000 metres (1998) and 7:21.57 in the 5000 metres (1999).

During her career she set 23 Norwegian speed-skating records, at the distances 1500 m, 3000 m, and 5000 m, and all-round.

References

External links 
 

1970 births
Living people
People from Aurskog-Høland
People from Lørenskog
Norwegian female speed skaters
Olympic speed skaters of Norway
Speed skaters at the 1992 Winter Olympics
Speed skaters at the 1998 Winter Olympics
Sportspeople from Viken (county)